is a railway station in the city of Ichinomiya, Aichi Prefecture, Japan, operated by Meitetsu.

Lines
Iwato Station is served by the Meitetsu Nagoya Main Line and is 89.2 kilometers from the terminus of the line at Toyohashi Station.

Station layout
The station has two opposed side platforms connected by a  footbridge. The station has automated ticket machines, Manaca automated turnstiles and is unattended.

Platforms

Adjacent stations

Station history
It was renamed February 10, 1941. Operations were suspended in 1944, and the station was reopened on September 23, 1956.

Passenger statistics
In fiscal 2013, the station was used by an average of 2708 passengers daily.

Surrounding area
 Imaise Nishi Elementary School
 Iwato Jinja

See also
 List of Railway Stations in Japan

References

External links

 Official web page 

Railway stations in Japan opened in 1935
Railway stations in Aichi Prefecture
Stations of Nagoya Railroad
Ichinomiya, Aichi